Lee County Public Schools can refer to:
 Lee County Public Schools (North Carolina)
 Lee County Public Schools (Virginia)
 School District of Lee County, Florida
See also:
 Lee County School District (disambiguation)